Fredrick Martin Jannetty (born February 3, 1960) is an American professional wrestler who has worked for promotions including the World Wrestling Federation/Entertainment (WWF/E), the American Wrestling Association (AWA), World Championship Wrestling (WCW) and Extreme Championship Wrestling (ECW), and has won a total of 20 championships.

Jannetty is widely known for his tenure as half of tag team The Rockers, in which he partnered with Shawn Michaels. The duo originally found success during the mid-to-late 1980s under the moniker of The Midnight Rockers, becoming two-time AWA World Tag Team Champions and winning various regional titles. They became one of the foremost teams of the WWF's "Golden Age", headlining multiple events. The Rockers held the WWF World Tag Team Championship in late 1990, but their reign was voided for disputed reasons.

After splitting from Michaels in early 1992, Jannetty became a one-time WWF Intercontinental Champion and a one-time WWF World Tag Team Champion with the 1-2-3 Kid. He competed in multiple world championship matches between ECW and the WWF from 1995–1996, but Jannetty's star faded thereafter, and he was largely used as enhancement talent during a late 1990s run in WCW. He made sporadic appearances for WWE during the latter half of the 2000s (including a brief 2005 reunion with Michaels), and has remained a challenger for titles on the independent circuit.

Although his career was continually halted by personal issues and his achievements overshadowed by those of Michaels, Jannetty was described by Talksport as being "as smooth and jaw-dropping as his partner, with a drop-kick to rival any".

Early life

Jannetty was an amateur wrestler in the state of Georgia, qualifying for the state championship tournament his last three years of high school. He also boxed while in high school, and won many Golden Gloves events. After high school, he wrestled at Chattahoochee Valley Community College in Alabama where he was a two time NJCAA qualifier.

He then went to Auburn University to wrestle, but the school dropped its wrestling program. He thought about trying football, but was instead coaxed into professional wrestling by Jerry Oates, who trained him.

Professional wrestling career

Early career (1983–1984) 
Jannetty began his wrestling career in September 1983 for Mid-South Wrestling teaming with trainer Jerry Oates (as "cousin" Marty Oates), until November. After leaving Mid-South, he would wrestle under his real name for Southeastern Championship Wrestling, where he would wrestle the likes of Super Olympia and Mr. Olympia.

Central States Wrestling (1984–1986) 

Jannetty resumed his wrestling career in March 1984, wrestling for the National Wrestling Alliance affiliate Central States Wrestling. He wrestled in singles and tag team competition with various partners, including Bulldog Bob Brown, Dave Peterson and Tommy Rogers (as The Uptown Boys) until joining forces with fellow rookie Shawn Michaels in late 1985. The two teamed as The Midnight Rockers and quickly won the NWA Central States Tag Team Championship from The Batten Twins. Jannetty wrestled Ric Flair for the NWA World Heavyweight Championship during his time in CSW.

In the summer of 1985, Jannetty wrestled his first Japanese tour for All Japan Pro Wrestling, where his biggest match there was a loss to Tiger Mask II on September 5.

American Wrestling Association (1986–1988) 

In 1986, the duo left CSW for the American Wrestling Association. In the AWA, Jannetty and Michaels quickly built a reputation as a talented tag team, performing many acrobatic moves in tandem and electrifying crowds with their athleticism. The two won the World Tag Team Championship twice, first defeating Buddy Rose and Doug Somers and then The Midnight Express for their second and final reign. They also won the Southern Tag Team Championship twice after defeating the Rock 'n' Roll RPMs on two separate occasions before jumping to the World Wrestling Federation in 1988.

World Wrestling Federation

The Rockers (1988–1992)

Now called simply The Rockers, Jannetty and Michaels' popularity carried over from their stint in the AWA and the team was often called "tag team specialists" by commentator Gorilla Monsoon. They made their WWF debut at a television taping on June 18, 1988, and they faced tag teams such as Demolition, The Hart Foundation, and the Brain Busters for the rest of 1989. Duos including The Rockers routinely headlined house show events during this era of tag team wrestling.

Despite their previous success, The Rockers never officially won the Tag Team Championship during their three-year run together in the WWF. On October 30, 1990, The Rockers were scheduled to win the titles from The Hart Foundation due to Jim Neidhart, one-half of the championship team, being in the process of negotiating his release from the company. The match was taped with The Rockers fairly winning the belts, but soon after, Neidhart reportedly came to a stop-gap agreement with management and was rehired. On the other hand, Michaels claimed in his book that the Hart Foundation lobbied backstage to keep the title. The belts were returned to the Hart Foundation a week later, and despite The Rockers making a title defense against Power and Glory on November 3, the change was never broadcast or acknowledged on television.

During a tag team match at the USF Sun Dome in December 1990, Jannetty executed his Rocker Dropper finishing move on Chuck Austin, who was teaming with The Genius. Austin's neck was instantly broken as a result of tucking his head during the move, rather than falling flat on the mat. Austin was paralyzed and sued Jannetty, Michaels, and Titan Sports. When the case finally came to court in early 1994, Austin was awarded $26.7 million.

In a 1991 angle, Michaels was "accidentally" kicked in the face during a maneuver initiated by Jannetty on one of The Nasty Boys, which clipped Shawn in the face and resulted in an elimination at Survivor Series. Michaels got up after being pinned and began screaming at Jannetty, blaming him for being eliminated. After weeks of tension, the team was granted a WWF World Tag Team Championship match against The Legion of Doom on the December 28, 1991 edition of WWF Superstars. The Rockers were unsuccessful following another miscommuncation. Michaels launched Jannetty into Animal for a double-team move where Michaels would dropkick Jannetty's back, knocking him on top of Animal. Instead, Animal turned at the last second and Michaels dropkicked him. Animal fell on top of Jannetty and got the 3-count. Following the match, Michaels was irate at Jannetty for getting pinned while Jannetty tried to calm him down. After pushing away an attempted hug by Jannetty, Michaels slapped Jannetty in the face twice. Jannetty refused to fight back and stormed out the ring while Michaels taunted the booing crowd.

Attempting to help settle their differences, Brutus Beefcake invited both on his interview segment "The Barber Shop" on the January 12, 1992 episode of WWF Wrestling Challenge. Michaels and Jannetty appeared to reconcile, but then Michaels turned heel, hitting Jannetty with "Sweet Chin Music". He then picked up Jannetty and tossed him through the big Barber Shop glass window, causing him to bleed profusely. Jannetty was initially meant to work the injury, thus missing the opportunity to win the vacant WWF Championship at the 1992 Royal Rumble. He was scheduled to return shortly after to start a feud which was to lead to a one-on-one match between Michaels and Jannetty at WrestleMania VIII.

However, in the early hours of January 25, 1992, Jannetty was arrested in Tampa, FL after an altercation with police. His female companion, a 19-year-old named Angela Ialacci, was arrested for trying to use a fake ID. Jannetty assaulted the officer performing the arrest, which led to his arrest. They were found to be in possession of less than a gram of cocaine. Jannetty was charged with possession of cocaine, possession of drug paraphernalia, and resisting arrest with force. He was indefinitely suspended by the WWF following the incident and his singles matches that were taped in January did not air. In March 1992, he was sentenced to 6 months of house arrest and was released by the WWF shortly after. Michaels ended up facing El Matador in the opening match of WrestleMania VIII with no significant storyline other than Michaels being upset that El Matador eliminated him from the Royal Rumble.

United States Wrestling Association (1992)
After first leaving the WWF in 1992 and awaiting sentencing for his arrest, Jannetty joined the USWA as a heel. During his stay, he was managed by Bert Prentice and feuded with Jerry Lawler.

Return to WWF

Intercontinental Champion (1992–1993)
Shortly after his house arrest concluded, Jannetty re-signed with the WWF and returned on October 12, 1992 at a TV taping in Saskatoon, Saskatchewan from the crowd, attempting to strike Michaels with his mirror but inadvertently hitting Sensational Sherri, Michaels's then-manager, when Michaels pulled her in front. He challenged Michaels to a match at the 1993 Royal Rumble for the Intercontintental Championship. The match had a secondary storyline, promoting the return of Sensational Sherri from her injuries and speculating whose corner Sherri would be in. During the match, Michaels rolled outside the ring looking to Sherri for comfort. Sherri slapped Michaels, turning babyface and aligning with Jannetty. Jannetty lost after interference by Sherri backfired. After the match, Sherri was being interviewed backstage when Michaels confronted her. Jannetty attacked Michaels during the confrontation. They had to be separated by referees and officials, indicating that their feud would continue and perhaps lead to a rematch at WrestleMania IX. But Jannetty was released again after rumors circulated stating that he had been under the influence of alcohol or other drugs during the match, leading to its comparably low quality. Michaels was then suddenly shifted into a feud with Tatanka. Jannetty to this day denies having been intoxicated at the event, but explains having been rather tired because of lack of sleep, and that the rumor had been started by Shawn Michaels to escape blame for the match being disappointing.

Jannetty returned once again on May 17, 1993, challenging Michaels for the Intercontinental Championship after appearing out of the crowd on Monday Night RAW when Michaels was being interviewed by Vince McMahon and telling the audience that he would defend his title against anyone at any time. Though Michaels initially tried to back out of fighting Jannetty (clearly not expecting anyone, least of all Jannetty, to challenge him that night), he eventually put his title on the line against his former partner. Jannetty won the title that night, thanks to Mr. Perfect preventing Michaels from heading to the locker room where he would be counted out but keep his title. Jannetty had only one title defense on TV, defeating Bam Bam Bigelow by countout on the May 31, 1993 edition of Monday Night RAW. He lost the title back to Michaels on June 6, 1993 in a non-televised match in Albany, New York due to interference from Michaels' debuting bodyguard Diesel. The title change was never shown on television and to this day no footage has ever surfaced.

According to Jannetty, it was Curt Hennig who petitioned to bring him back to the WWF. Hennig, who was on good terms with Vince McMahon, convinced Vince that Michaels also deserved some responsibility for the poor Rumble '93 match. Jannetty believes that his title victory was meant as punishment for Shawn Michaels for lying.

After losing the championship back to Michaels, Jannetty feuded with Doink the Clown, eventually winning the program with a final best of three falls match on the June 21, 1993 edition of Monday Night Raw where Doink almost won the match 2 falls to 1 after Doink II interfered in the match. Randy Savage (who was commentating the match), attacked the first Doink and revealed the second to the referee, making Jannetty win by reversed decision.

Teaming with 1-2-3 Kid (1993–1994)
Jannetty then formed a tag team with the 1-2-3 Kid, with the two being the winners and survivors of their match at Survivor Series.

Jannetty won the Tag Team Championship with the 1-2-3 Kid from The Quebecers (Jacques and Pierre) on the January 10 episode of Monday Night Raw. They lost the title to The Quebecers seven days later at Madison Square Garden at a non-televised event when 1-2-3 Kid was pinned following an assisted senton. A clip of the finish of the match aired on the 1994 Royal Rumble video.

In the lead up to WrestleMania X, the court case brought forward by Charles Austin was heard. While neither the WWF or Jannetty admitted that it was the outcome of this case which resulted in Jannetty's sudden disappearance from the promotion, it has never been denied either. Jannetty then vanished from the mainstream wrestling scene until early 1995 when he made several appearances in Extreme Championship Wrestling.

Extreme Championship Wrestling (1995)
Jannetty debuted for ECW on February 25 at the ECW show Return of the Funker where he challenged ECW World Heavyweight Champion Shane Douglas in a losing effort. A few months later on April 28, Jannetty defeated Jim Neidhart and the next night he defeated Shane Douglas. On May 13 at Enter the Sandman Jannetty challenged Eddie Guerrero for the ECW World Television Championship but failed to win the title. On July 20 Jannetty defeated Bull Pain, the next night on July 21, Jannetty defeated The Terrorist. On June 9 and July 22, Jannetty unsuccessfully challenged The Sandman for the ECW World Heavyweight Championship. On July 28 Jannetty faced Jim Neidhart with the match ending in a double disqualification. This turned out to be Jannetty's final match in ECW as he left for the WWF again.

Second Return to WWF (1995-1996)

Partnership with Razor Ramon
Later that year, just months after Michaels made a shocking face turn that got him over, Jannetty returned to the WWF in September 1995. He continued to wrestle as a face, despite bad blood between him and Michaels that had carried over in the storylines. Jannetty formed an alliance with Razor Ramon during the final two months of the year to help with his ongoing issues with Sycho Sid and the now heel 1-2-3 Kid. At the December 1995 In Your House PPV, Jannetty & Razor defeated Sid & The 1-2-3 Kid in a tag team match.

The New Rockers
Following an unsuccessful bid to win the 1996 Royal Rumble, Jannetty turned heel in February 1996 to form "The New Rockers". His new partner was Avatar, who was repackaged as Leif Cassidy with no mention of his previous gimmick that he was still using that same month. The team was presented as goofy and annoying by acting like they were still in the 1970s; Cassidy moreso than Jannetty. The team's first match was a first-round contest in a tournament for the vacant WWF World Tag Team Championship. The debut was not a strong one, as they were eliminated from the tournament by The Godwinns in less than 5 minutes. The team was largely unsuccessful and rarely won any matches on television. Jannetty interfered unsuccessfully in a singles match between Michaels and Cassidy that March, then lost to Michaels in a WWF Championship match at the Kuwait Cup event in May, as well as in a non-title match that July.  The team's first and only pay-per-view appearance came at Survivor Series 1996, when they teamed with Owen Hart & The British Bulldog to face Doug Furnas & Phil LaFon and The Godwinns in an elimination match. Jannetty was the first participant eliminated. Jannetty asked for his release from the company after the show, as he was unhappy with the team's lack of success and management's refusal to split them up. His last match came when they were defeated by Pierroth & Cibernetico in a match that aired on the December 23, 1996 episode of RAW.

Independent circuit (1997–present)

After his run with the World Wrestling Federation, Jannetty joined the New York-based independent promotion Ultimate Championship Wrestling in 1997 along with other WWF alumni. He also made an appearance in ECW when he teamed with Vampire Warrior in a losing match against Roadkill and former partner Al Snow at a house show in Orlando, FL on September 27, 1997.

Jannetty made his first appearance following this injury on May 8, 1999, facing IPW Heavyweight Champion The Cuban Assassin. In the summer of 1999 he embarked on a tour of Australia for the Australasian Wrestling Federation (AWF), facing Sabu, Chris Candido, and TNT. On October 10, 1999 he teamed with Tommy Rogers against The Samoan Swat Team on the Heroes of Wrestling PPV. After wrestling one match in ECW in 2000, Jannetty resumed working in independent promotions, including a stint in Jimmy Hart's XWF promotion.

His most active recent year on the independent was in 2012, where he competed in over a dozen matches. In May 2018, Jannetty wrestled his most recent singles match for AIW, a match he lost to Joey Janela.

World Championship Wrestling (1998–1999)
As part of an effort to enhance WCW's roster as Thunder was introduced into the weekly lineup, World Championship Wrestling signed several former WWF wrestlers including Jannetty. He made his debut on the January 12, 1998 edition of WCW Monday Nitro, defeating Black Cat. A week later on Nitro, he was defeated by Chris Benoit. Much as Al Snow's run in the WWF in 1997, Jannetty was initially utilized at an enhancement level, falling to wrestlers such as Raven, Dean Malenko, and Chris Jericho. He was successful lower level competition, defeating Lenny Lane, Frankie Lancaster, and Horshu.

In April 1998 he had his first substantial winning streak in WCW, defeating Barry Horowitz and Vincent. In May he began a house show series with Konnan. In July he wrestled Konnan in another series of house show matches, and his final match came on August 31 when he lost to Konnan on Nitro. Jannetty was released from his contract while recovering from a shoulder injury suffered during this match.

Third Return to WWE (2005–2009)
On the March 14, 2005 episode of Raw, Jannetty returned for a one-time only reunion with his former tag team partner Shawn Michaels, once again billed as The Rockers and performing their traditional entrance with their original music, against La Résistance (Sylvain Grenier and Rob Conway). Jannetty scored the win for his team after he used his signature Rocker Dropper.

This was preparation for Jannetty's match with Kurt Angle on that week's SmackDown!, as Angle had challenged Jannetty prior to his WrestleMania 21 match with Shawn Michaels. Angle claimed that since Jannetty had taught Michaels "everything he knows" while part of The Rockers, he could teach Michaels "how to tap out" by forcing Jannetty to submit on SmackDown!. Angle made good on his promise and forced Jannetty to submit to his ankle lock, but only after a nearly twenty-minute match and an impressive showing for Jannetty which saw him nearly pin the Olympic champion. WWE soon signed him to a new contract, however he was arrested and unable to meet the commitments of his WWE contract, leading to his release on July 6.

On the February 20, 2006 episode of Raw, Shawn Michaels was pitted against four of the five members of the Spirit Squad in their in-ring debut. After he had used Sweet Chin Music, Michaels was attacked by all five members until an unknown man came storming in to the ring to defend Michaels. During the melee, it was revealed that it was Marty Jannetty coming to defend his former tag team partner. Later on Raw, Vince McMahon came out to mention that he would offer Jannetty a full-time contract. McMahon then added a stipulation that Jannetty had to join Mr. McMahon's "Kiss My Ass Club" the following week on Raw.

Jannetty refused, and McMahon instead offered Jannetty the possibility of breaking Chris Masters' signature submission hold, the Master Lock. Jannetty appeared to almost break the hold, but Mr. McMahon (who was officiating) hit Jannetty with a low blow. Unable to break it, he was only released from the hold when Michaels ran in to save him. Shortly after Michaels had saved Jannetty, Shane McMahon ran in the ring with a steel chair and knocked out Michaels. The former Rockers were supposed to continue a program with the McMahons, but Jannetty was absent from the next episode of Raw and instead Triple H and Shawn Michaels reunited as D-Generation X. On March 3, WWE announced that it had severed all professional ties with Jannetty without further explanation.

On September 15, it was announced on WWE.com that Jannetty had signed a new contract and would be returning as a veteran to work with younger talent. WWE.com also stated that Jannetty, along with Brad Armstrong and Rodney Mack, could also be granted a full-time contract pending the success of this initial venture.

According to Wrestling Observer Newsletter, Jannetty was rumored to have been released yet again on September 29. Jannetty countered this rumor on his Myspace page, stating it was untrue. In a blog on his website, Jim Ross said Jannetty was no longer with WWE on December 24 due to a court order in Florida preventing him from traveling on the road.

On the December 3, 2007 episode of Raw, Mr. Kennedy, who was feuding with Shawn Michaels at the time, said that he would speak to three people who knew Michaels very well as part of a feud between him and Michaels. The three were imposters dressed as Razor Ramon, Diesel, and Jannetty. Along with a fake Michaels, they were all attacked with Sweet Chin Music by the real Michaels. The next week on the 15th anniversary of Raw, Jannetty appeared along with Michaels in an interview. Michaels wanted to see what would happen when Kennedy fought the real Jannetty. In the end, he was defeated by Kennedy.

On October 19, 2009, Jannetty made an appearance on Raw, losing in a match against The Miz.

Chikara (2011–2013)
On October 22, 2011 it was announced that Jannetty had signed with Chikara as a trainer and as a wrestler. His debut match for the promotion was booked for October 29 against Tursas, but the show was eventually cancelled. He then made his official debut on November 13 at High Noon, Chikara's inaugural internet pay-per-view, by accompanying The Young Bucks (Matt and Nick Jackson) to the ring. Jannetty made his Chikara in-ring debut on August 12, 2012, when he teamed with Green Ant in a tag team match, where they were defeated by Los Ice Creams (El Hijo del Ice Cream and Ice Cream, Jr.). Jannetty returned on September 16, 2012, when he and the 1-2-3 Kid won the annual tag team gauntlet match at the 2012 King of Trios. When Jannetty and the 1-2-3 Kid also defeated the Heart Throbs (Antonio Thomas and Romeo Roselli) on November 18, they earned their third point, or third back-to-back win, and a future shot at the Chikara Campeonatos de Parejas. Jannetty and the 1-2-3 Kid received their title shot on December 2 at the Under the Hood internet pay-per-view, where they were defeated by the defending champions, The Young Bucks.

Personal life
In July 2016, Jannetty was named part of a class action lawsuit filed against the WWE which alleged that wrestlers incurred traumatic brain injuries during their tenure and that the company concealed the risks of injury. The suit was litigated by attorney Konstantine Kyros, who has been involved in a number of other lawsuits against the WWE. The lawsuit was dismissed by US District Judge Vanessa Lynne Bryant in September 2018. Bryant was critical of Kyros for including irrelevant information in the lawsuit, including details about Jannetty’s broken ankle, which she said had wasted the court's time.

In the early morning hours of August 5, 2020, Jannetty made a Facebook post in which he said he made a man "disappear" when he was 13. Police in Columbus, Georgia confirmed that they would investigate the post. Jannetty later clarified that he did not kill the man, but he hit him in the head with a brick after an attempted sexual assault and "made [him] disappear". The following month, Jannetty said that his comments were part of a wrestling storyline, which he had to drop because of the police investigation.

Championships and accomplishments
 American Wrestling Association
 AWA World Tag Team Championship (2 times) – with Shawn Michaels
 Central States Wrestling
 NWA Central States Heavyweight Championship (2 times)
 NWA Central States Tag Team Championship (5 times) – with Tommy Rogers (2), Bob Brown (2) and Shawn Michaels (1)
 NWA Central States Television Championship (1 time)
 Continental Wrestling Association
 AWA Southern Tag Team Championship (2 times) – with Shawn Michaels
 Deutsche Wrestling Allianz
 DWA World Heavyweight Championship (1 time)
 Dynamic Wrestling Alliance
 DWA Internet Championship (1 time)
 Platinum Wrestling Worldwide
 PWW Heavyweight Championship (1 time)
 Michigan Wrestling Alliance
 MWA Heavyweight Championship (1 time)
 Midwest Territorial Wrestling
 MTW Heavyweight Championship
 New Age Wrestling
 NAW Television Championship (1 time)
 Pro Wrestling Illustrated
 Ranked No. 13 of the top 500 singles wrestlers in the PWI 500 in 1993
 Ranked No. 194 of the Top 500 singles wrestlers of the "PWI Years" in 2003
 Ranked No. 33 of the Top 100 Tag Teams of the "PWI Years" with Shawn Michaels in 2003
 PWI Match of the Year (1993) vs. Shawn Michaels on Monday Night Raw on May 17
 UWA Elite
 UWA Elite iChampionship (1 time)
World Wide Wrestling Alliance
 WWWA Intercontinental Championship (1 time)
 World Wrestling Federation
 WWF Intercontinental Championship (1 time)
 WWF Tag Team Championship (1 time) – with the 1-2-3 Kid
 Wrestling Observer Newsletter
 Tag Team of the Year (1989) with Shawn Michaels

References

External links 

 
 
 

1960 births
American male professional wrestlers
Living people
Sportspeople from Columbus, Georgia
Professional wrestlers from Georgia (U.S. state)
WWF/WWE Intercontinental Champions
20th-century professional wrestlers
21st-century professional wrestlers
AWA World Tag Team Champions